Events in the year 1938 in Peru.

Incumbents
President: Óscar R. Benavides
First Vice President: Ernesto Montagne Markholz 
Second Vice President: Antonio Rodríguez Ramírez
Prime Minister: Ernesto Montagne Markholz

Events
December 24 – The Lima Declaration is approved by 21 American countries, affirming the sovereignty of Latin American states.

Births
 May 16 – Marco Aurelio Denegri, Peruvian linguist, intellectual and sexologist (died 2018)
 July 28 – Alberto Fujimori, President of Peru

Deaths
April 15 - César Vallejo, poet (born 1892)

See also
 1938 Peruvian Primera División

References